Valters and Kaža, known internationally as Walters and Kazha, were a Latvian music duo consisting of Valters Frīdenbergs and Kārlis Būmeisters. They were best known for representing  in the Eurovision Song Contest 2005 with the song "The War Is Not Over", written by Mārtiņš Freimanis, finishing in fifth place with 153 points.

Career

2005: Eurovision Song Contest
On 26 February 2005, the duo were selected to represent Latvia in the Eurovision Song Contest 2005, held in Kyiv, Ukraine.

In the semi-final, which was held two days before the final, they performed fifth, following 's Zdob și Zdub and preceding 's Lise Darly. They qualified in tenth place with 85 points. At the after-party, Valters lost his voice and subsequently, at the dress rehearsal, he did not sing the entire song. In the grand final, he sang parts of the song one octave lower than they should've been. Despite this, they finished in fifth place with 153 points.

After Eurovision
In , Valters made a solo effort to represent  with his song "For A Better Tomorrow" but failed to qualify from the semi-final.

Two years later, the duo provided the Latvian commentary for the Eurovision Song Contest 2011. Valters was also Latvia's spokesperson at the Eurovision Song Contest 2012.

Valters Fridenbergs' death
On 17 October 2018, it was announced that Valters Frīdenbergs had died of a two-year long battle with cancer.

References

External links

Eurovision Song Contest entrants for Latvia
Eurovision Song Contest entrants of 2005
Latvian pop music groups